The 2008 Gators went 70–5 overall and 27–1 in SEC play. The 70 wins set an NCAA single season record and Florida, named the #1 overall seed in the NCAA tournament, advanced to the semifinals of the Women's College World Series. They also were the SEC regular season and tournament champions. Five Gators were named All-Americans (Stacey Nelson, Kim Waleszonia, Aja Paculba, Francesca Enea, and Ali Gardiner) and Junior pitcher Stacey Nelson was the SEC Pitcher of the Year.

Previous season
The 2007 Florida Gators finished second in the SEC East and made it to the SEC Tournament title game before losing to LSU.  They were also invited to host Regionals of the NCAA tournament.  After breezing through the Gainesville Regional, the Gators lost the three-game series to Texas A&M 2–1.

Pre-season
The 2008 Gators started the season ranked No. 13 in the NFCA/USA Today poll.  They returned All-Americans Stacey Nelson and Kim Waleszonia as well as six other starters from the 2007 team.

Schedule

|-
!colspan=9| USF-Wilson Tournament

|-
!colspan=9|

|-
!colspan=9| Cox Communications Classic

|-
!colspan=9|

|-
!colspan=9| Aquafina Invitational

|-
!colspan=9|

|-
!colspan=9| Worth Invitational

|-
!colspan=9|

|-
!colspan=9| SEC Tournament

|-
!colspan=9| NCAA Regionals

|-
!colspan=9| NCAA Super Regionals

|-
!colspan=9| Women's College World Series

Game notes

Bethune–Cookman

Florida Gulf Coast

Illinois

Memphis

South Florida

Mercer (Game 1)

Mercer (Game 2)

East Tennessee State (Game 1)

College of Charleston

North Carolina (Game 1)

East Tennessee State (Game 2)

North Carolina (Game 2)

Stetson

Hofstra

Gardner–Webb (Game 1)

North Florida

Notre Dame (Game 1)

Gardner–Webb (Game 2)

Notre Dame (Game 2)

Long Beach State

Oregon State

Pacific

Cal State Fullerton

Louisville

Stanford

Ole Miss (Game 1)

Ole Miss (Game 2)

Ole Miss (Game 3)

Alabama (Game 1)

Alabama (Game 2)

Arkansas (Game 1)

Arkansas (Game 2)

Arkansas (Game 3)

Iowa

Longwood (Game 1)

Longwood (Game 2)

Longwood (Game 3)

South Carolina (Game 1)

South Carolina (Game 2)

LSU (Game 1)

LSU (Game 2)

LSU (Game 3)

Mississippi State (Game 1)

Mississippi State (Game 2)

Mississippi State (Game 3)

Georgia (Game 1)

Georgia (Game 2)

Georgia (Game 3)

Florida State (Game 1)

Florida State (Game 2)

Kentucky (Game 1)

Kentucky (Game 2)

Kentucky (Game 3)

Jacksonville (Game 1)

Jacksonville (Game 2)

Auburn (Game 1)

Auburn (Game 2)

Auburn (Game 3)

Tennessee (Game 1)

Tennessee (Game 2)

Tennessee (Game 3)

Ole Miss (SEC Tournament)

Tennessee (SEC Tournament

Alabama (SEC Tournament)

Georgia Tech (NCAA Gainesville Regional – Game 2)

UCF (NCAA Gainesville Regional – Game 3)

UCF (NCAA Gainesville Regional – Game 6)

UCF (NCAA Gainesville Regional – Game 7)

California (NCAA Gainesville Super Regional – Game 1)

California (NCAA Gainesville Super Regional – Game 2)

Louisiana-Lafayette (WCWS – Game 1)

Virginia Tech (WCWS – Game 7)

UCLA (WCWS – Game 9)

Texas A&M (WCWS – Game 11)

Texas A&M (WCWS – Game 13)

Ranking Movement

Roster
The 2008 Florida Gators softball team had 1 senior, 8 juniors, 3 sophomores, and 8 freshmen.

Coaching staff
Head coach: Tim Walton (3rd season)
Assistant Coaches: Jennifer Rocha (3rd season), Jenny Gladding (2nd season)
Athletic Trainer: Scott Schenker
Student Trainer: Arielle Gavdosh
Strength & Conditioning Coordinator: Steven Orris
Academic Counselor: Tony Meacham
Staff Assistant: Brittany Souilliard
Managers: Crystal Sleeman and Kip Collins

Statistics

References

See also
Florida Gators softball

Florida Gators softball seasons
Florida Gators softball team
Florida Gators softball team
2008 NCAA Division I softball tournament participants
Women's College World Series seasons